"Let the Eagle Soar" is a song written by former Missouri Senator and U.S. Attorney General John Ashcroft, who is seen singing the song at a Gordon-Conwell Theological Seminary function on February 23, 2002. The song was sung during President of the United States George W. Bush's second inauguration in January 2005 by Guy Hovis, a vocalist from the 1970s variety program The Lawrence Welk Show.

On July 4, 2011 Angela McKenzie, a singer and radio personality of the syndicated program Initiative Radio with Angela McKenzie, quietly released a contemporary Country music version of the song as a digital download with the official approval and blessing of John Ashcroft.

Background

John Ashcroft sang in The Singing Senators, a group of U.S. Senators who sang as a barbershop quartet.

In popular culture
 "Let the Eagle Soar" was sung by lil' John Ashcroft on an episode of Lil' Bush.
It has also been frequently mocked on late-night comedy shows such as The Daily Show with Jon Stewart, The Colbert Report and the Late Show with David Letterman.
It is part of Michael Moore's documentary Fahrenheit 9/11, and is also featured in the trailer. 
It was used in the 2015 film The Big Short and the 2021 film Don't Look Up .

References

External links

CNN video of John Ashcroft singing "Let the Eagle Soar"
"Ashcroft rallies troops with song"
"Staff cry poetic injustice as singing Ashcroft introduces patriot games"
"Division Streets, U.S.A."
"Loony tunes: US attorney-general's crooning glory"
"The Justice Department on music"
"'The List' -- Find Out Who Said What This Week"

2002 songs
American patriotic songs